The Matupiri Sustainable Development Reserve is a sustainable development reserve in the state of Amazonas, Brazil.

Location

The Matupiri Sustainable Development Reserve is in the municipality of Borba, Amazonas. The reserve is in the basin of the Madeira River. The Cunhã-Sapucaia Indigenous Territory adjoins the reserve to the north. To the east it adjoins the Matupiri State Park. To the south it adjoins the Rio Madeira Sustainable Development Reserve. The Matupiri River crosses the western portion of the reserve from southwest to northeast and then forms part of the boundary between the reserve and the Cunhã-Sapucaia Indigenous Territory.

History
The Matupiri Sustainable Development Reserve was created by decree 28423 of 27 March 2009. It was one of five conservation units created to meet some of the environmental licensing requirements for the work to upgrade the BR-319 highway from Porto Velho to Manaus, which was suspended by Carlos Minc, the Minister of the Environment. Minc defended what he called a "green pocket" around the highway. Construction of roads in the forests elsewhere had often encouraged deforestation, with a "herringbone" pattern of logging roads radiating from the highway. Thus the paving of BR-163 from Cuiabá, Mato Grosso to Santarém, Pará had increased deforestation in the area by 500%.

The state-level conservation units in the BR-319 corridor are the Piagaçu-Purus, Rio Amapá, Rio Madeira, Igapó-Açu, and Matupiri sustainable development reserves, Canutama Extractive Reserve, Canutama State Forest, Tapauá State Forest, and Matupiri State Park. In December 2012 the Amazonas state government allocated more than R$6 million to these nine units, covering  and 143 communities, to be coordinated by the State Center for Conservation Units (CEUC). The funding was for development of management plans, creation of management councils, environmental monitoring, land survey, and production and marketing.

The management plan for the Matupiri Sustainable Development Reserve was approved on 22 July 2014.

Notes

Sources

Protected areas of Amazonas (Brazilian state)
Sustainable development reserves of Brazil
2009 establishments in Brazil